Chabab Houara is a Moroccan football club currently playing in the second division. The club was founded in 1964 and is located in the town of Ouled Teima in the region of Houara.

Honours

Moroccan GNFA 1 Championship: 1
2006

References

Football clubs in Morocco
1964 establishments in Morocco
Sports clubs in Morocco